Gwendolyn Pang is the Secretary General of the Philippine Red Cross (PRC) ( on leave for two years) and currently the Head of Country Cluster Support Team of the International Federation of the Red Cross (IFRC).

Pang, who is credited with helping to modernize the Philippine Red Cross into becoming the Philippines' foremost humanitarian organization.  She is  now based in Beijing, China, where she is in charge of the East Asia Country Cluster for the IFRC, overseeing operations in South Korea, Mongolia, China, and Japan.

References

External links
Official biography at Philippine Red Cross

Year of birth missing (living people)
Living people
Red Cross personnel